Ranoidea mira, also known as the chocolate frog, is a species of tree frog in the subfamily Pelodryadinae, and is part of the Ranoidea caerulea species complex.
It was discovered in New Guinea by a research team led by Griffith University.

Taxonomy and systematics
It is likely that both the chocolate frog and the Australian green tree frog were derived from a common ancestor when Australia and New Guinea were linked by land about 2.6 million years ago. It was named mira (meaning surprised or strange in Latin) because of the surprising nature of the discovery, and its chocolate-brown skin.

Description
Ranoidea mira bears a close resemblance with the Australian green tree frog. They both look similar apart from their skin color. Ranoidea mira has a combination of webbing on hand, large size, limbs that are relatively short and robust as well as small violet patch of skin present on the edges of its eyes. It is a little smaller than the Australian green tree frog, at between 7 cm and 8 cm when fully mature.

Distribution and habitat
Ranoidea mira is endemic to New Guinea.

References

Ranoidea
Amphibians described in 2020
Amphibians of New Guinea